Paul Edward Davis (born 31 January 1968 in London Borough of Newham) is an English former professional footballer who played in the Football League, as a defender.

References

Sources
Profile at Neil Brown

1968 births
Living people
Footballers from the London Borough of Newham
English footballers
Association football defenders
Queens Park Rangers F.C. players
Aldershot F.C. players
Wealdstone F.C. players
English Football League players